Diocese of Požega may refer to:

 Serbian Orthodox Diocese of Požega, former diocese (eparchy) of the Serbian Orthodox Church, in Slavonia (Croatia).
 Roman Catholic Diocese of Požega, current diocese of the Catholic Church, in central Slavonia (Croatia).

See also
Požega
Eastern Orthodoxy in Croatia
Catholic Church in Croatia
Diocese of Zagreb (disambiguation)
Diocese of Zadar (disambiguation)
Diocese of Šibenik (disambiguation)